In anatomy, the thumb extensors are:

 extensor pollicis longus muscle
 extensor pollicis brevis muscle